Rendy Oscario Sroyer (born 7 October 1998), is an Indonesian professional footballer who plays as a goalkeeper for Liga 1 club Madura United.

Club career

Semen Padang
He was signed for Semen Padang to play in Indonesia Soccer Championship in 2016.

Persita Tangerang
In 2022, Oscario signed a contract with Indonesian Liga 1 club Persita Tangerang. He made his league debut on 7 January 2022 in a match against Persib Bandung at the Ngurah Rai Stadium, Denpasar.

Madura United
Oscario was signed for Madura United to play in Liga 1 in the 2022–23 season. He made his league debut on 23 July 2022 in a match against Barito Putera at the Gelora Ratu Pamelingan Stadium, Pamekasan.

Honours

Club 
Semen Padang
 Liga 2 runner-up: 2018

References

External links
 Rendy Oscario at Soccerway
 Rendy Oscario at Liga Indonesia

1998 births
Living people
Papuan people
Sportspeople from Jakarta
Indonesian footballers
Association football goalkeepers
Semen Padang F.C. players
Persita Tangerang players
Madura United F.C. players
Liga 1 (Indonesia) players
Liga 2 (Indonesia) players